Beher may refer to:

 Beher (company), or Bernardo Hernández, Spanish ham producer 
 Beher (poetry), a type of meter in Urdu poetry
 Beher (god), an Aksumite god